Rachel Ann Hardiman (born 5 January 1961) is an Irish international cricketer who made her first appearance for the Ireland national side in 1987. Hardiman was born in Dublin. A right-arm off break bowler, she played nine One Day International matches.

References

1961 births
Ireland women One Day International cricketers
Irish women cricketers
Living people
Cricketers from Dublin (city)